Oregon City Hall is the main municipal building for the Ogle County, Illinois city of Oregon. It stands on Oregon's Third Street, in the middle of the Oregon Commercial Historic District. The building is considered a contributing structure to the overall historical integrity of the historic district. Erected in 1920, the building, along with the rest of the historic district joined the National Register of Historic Places in August 2006.

Notes

Government buildings completed in 1920
Buildings and structures in Oregon Commercial Historic District
City and town halls in Illinois
Historic district contributing properties in Illinois
City and town halls on the National Register of Historic Places in Illinois